Aphaenops fresnedai is a species of beetle in the subfamily Trechinae. It was described by Faille & Bourdeau in 2011.

References

fresnedai
Beetles described in 2011